The  are tidal whirlpools in the Naruto Strait, a channel between Naruto in Tokushima and Awaji Island in Hyōgo, Japan. The strait is one of the connections between the Pacific Ocean and the Inland Sea, a body of water separating Honshū and Shikoku, two of the main islands of Japan. The tide moves large amounts of water into the Inland Sea twice a day and also removes large amounts of water twice a day. Due to the narrowness of the strait, the water rushes through the Naruto channel at a speed of about  four times a day, twice flowing in and twice flowing out.

The whirlpools can be observed from the shore on Awaji island, from tourist ships, or from the 1985 Ōnaruto Bridge spanning the strait.

The whirlpools inspired the name for narutomaki surimi which in turn inspired the name Naruto Uzumaki from the manga and anime Naruto, "Uzumaki" (うずまき) meaning "spiral". The storyline starts with building the Great Naruto Bridge (なると大橋, Naruto Ōhashi) into The Land of Waves (波の国, Nami no Kuni) which is based on the Naruto Bridge spanning the Naruto Strait.

See also
Tourism in Japan
Narutomaki

External links 
 Forum about schedule and tides

Bodies of water of Japan
Whirlpools
Landforms of Tokushima Prefecture
Tourist attractions in Tokushima Prefecture
Naruto, Tokushima